The Hamilton Bulldogs were a professional ice hockey team in the American Hockey League. They played in Hamilton, Ontario, at FirstOntario Centre (formerly known as Copps Coliseum), nicknamed 'The Dog Pound'. They were the AHL affiliate of the NHL's Edmonton Oilers and Montreal Canadiens as two separate franchises over 19 seasons of continuous participation in the AHL. The team won the Calder Cup once in its history, in 2007.

History

1996–2002: Edmonton Oilers AHL franchise
The Hamilton Bulldogs Hockey Club was first established in 1996 following the relocation of the Cape Breton Oilers. The team was nicknamed the "Bulldogs" as it was determined to best suit the City of Hamilton. The name "Hamilton Havoc" was runner-up.

On the ice, the club has reached the Calder Cup Finals three times. Firstly in 1997, the club's first year, and again in 2003 only to lose in both cases. The 2003 game 7 final was played June 12, 2003, vs the Houston Aeros. The attendance at Copps Coliseum  was 17,428, making it the largest playoff crowd in the history of the AHL (the record was since broken in 2005 in Philadelphia). Houston won the game 3–0 and the series 4–3.  The Bulldogs finally won the Calder Cup Final in 2007 against the Hershey Bears. This series was a rematch of the 1997 Calder Cup Final which Hershey won 4 games to 1. The Bulldogs reversed that in 2007 – Hamilton 4 games to Hershey's 1.

Off the ice, the club faced turmoil in 2000 resulting in a "Stay Dogs Stay" campaign spearheaded by Don Robertson, Ron Burnstein, Nick Javor, and club President Cary Kaplan, aimed at keeping the franchise in Hamilton. The campaign was a financial success and resulted in the club remaining in the Steel City with a bolstered fan base and an improved lease with the City of Hamilton.

2002–2015: Montreal Canadiens affiliation, and keeping the Bulldogs in Hamilton
In spite of a franchise high in attendance in 2001, the Edmonton Oilers announced plans to move their AHL franchise to Toronto. The same "Stay Dogs Stay" committee went back to work for the second consecutive year, and secured local interests who made a multimillion-dollar investment to secure ownership of the Quebec Citadelles franchise from the Montreal Canadiens and merged them with Hamilton, thus keeping the Bulldogs in town. The achievement to preserve the team was a unique joint venture between the Montreal Canadiens, the Edmonton Oilers, the American Hockey League, and a local consortium of Hamilton owners, which allowed for a joint affiliation in 2002–03 between Montreal and Edmonton as ownership changed hands. After the 2002–03 season, the Oilers officially relocated their franchise to Toronto and became the Toronto Roadrunners. As part of the merger agreement, the Bulldogs were able to retain much of their team and staff that had been affiliated with the Canadiens to keep team continuity for the following season. Fans voted to keep the Bulldogs name which won over the Hamilton Canadiens and Hamilton Habs.

In the summer of 2004, Burlington businessman Michael Andlauer bought out much of the minority shares of the franchise to become majority owner, governor, and chairman of the Hamilton Bulldogs. Andlauer was part of the initial group of local business people who purchased the Bulldogs team from the Edmonton Oilers and the Citadelles franchise from the Montreal Canadiens in 2002. By 2011, Andlauer owned 100% of the franchise.

In the 2006–07 season, the Bulldogs won their first Calder Cup after defeating the  Hershey Bears in the Calder Cup finals in five games. However, they failed to qualify for the playoffs in the 2007–08 season, making them the first defending Calder Cup champion to miss the playoffs in the following season since the Calder Cup playoff bracket expanded from 12 teams to 16 teams in 1996.

In 2010, fans saw the Bulldogs under coach Guy Boucher advance to the Western Conference finals against the Texas Stars, only to lose a hard fought series in game seven.

2015: repurchase by the Canadiens and relocation to St. John's
On March 12, 2015, Michael Andlauer announced that he had sold the Hamilton Bulldogs' AHL franchise back to the Canadiens, and that the team would move to St. John's, Newfoundland for the 2015–16 season as the St. John's IceCaps. The existing True North Sports and Entertainment-owned IceCaps, which are affiliated with the Winnipeg Jets, moved back to Winnipeg as the Manitoba Moose. Concurrently, Andlauer announced his acquisition of the Ontario Hockey League's Belleville Bulls, and that the team would be moved to Hamilton and adopt the Bulldogs name.

Franchise timelines
List of timelines for the two separate franchises known as the Hamilton Bulldogs.

Edmonton Oilers AHL franchise
Nova Scotia Oilers (1984–1988)
Cape Breton Oilers (1988–1996)
Hamilton Bulldogs (1996–2003)
Toronto Roadrunners (2003–2004)
Edmonton Road Runners (2004–2005)
Franchise dormant from 2005–2010
Oklahoma City Barons (2010–2015) – Edmonton Oilers franchise resurrected.
Bakersfield Condors (2015–present)

Montreal Canadiens AHL franchise
Montreal Voyageurs (1969–1971)
Nova Scotia Voyageurs (1971–1984)
Sherbrooke Canadiens (1984–1990)
Fredericton Canadiens (1990–1999)
Quebec Citadelles (1999–2002)
Hamilton Bulldogs (2002–2015) – Affiliation only; franchise purchased by the ownership group of Hamilton Bulldogs and fully owned by Michael Andlauer in 2004.
St. John's IceCaps (2015–2017) – Canadiens ownership group repurchased franchise license from Michael Andlauer.
Laval Rocket (2017– )

Season-by-season results

Players

Team captains

Notable NHL alumni
List of Hamilton Bulldogs alumni who played more than 100 games in Hamilton and 100 or more games in the National Hockey League.

Team records

Single season
Goals: Paul Healey, 39 (2000–01)
Assists: Daniel Cleary, 52 (1999–2000)
Points: David Desharnais, 78 (2009–10)
Penalty minutes: Dennis Bonvie, 522 (1996–97)
GAA: Cedrick Desjardins, 2.00 (2009–10)
SV%: Steve Passmore (1998–99) & Jaroslav Halak (2007–08), .929
Points: 115 (2009–10)
Most wins overall: 52 (2009–10)
Most wins at home: 25
Most wins on the road: 27

Playoffs
Playoff goaltending wins (1 season): Carey Price, 15 (2006–2007)

Career
Career goals: Corey Locke, 85
Career assists: Corey Locke, 144
Career points: Corey Locke, 229
Career penalty minutes: Dennis Bonvie, 817
Career goaltending wins: Yann Danis, 81
Career shutouts: Jaroslav Halak, 11
Career games: Alex Henry, 486

Head coaches

Team presidents and general managers
Glen Sather, president, 1996–2000 
Scott Howson, general manager, 1996–2002 
Cary Kaplan, president, 2000–2002 (with club from 1996) 
Steve Katzman, president, 2002–2003 
Brian Lewis, 2003–2006   
Glenn Stanford, president, 2006–2010
Bob McNamara, president, 2010–2011
Stephen Ostaszewicz, president, 2012–2015 
Marc Bergevin, general manager, 2012–2015

See also
List of ice hockey teams in Ontario

References

External links
 

 
Edmonton Oilers minor league affiliates
Ice hockey clubs established in 1996
Montreal Canadiens minor league affiliates
Tampa Bay Lightning minor league affiliates
Ice hockey clubs disestablished in 2015
1996 establishments in Ontario
2015 disestablishments in Ontario